Cercidia is a genus of orb-weaver spiders first described by Tamerlan Thorell in 1869.  it contains only three species.

References

Araneidae
Araneomorphae genera
Holarctic spiders
Spiders of Asia
Taxa named by Tamerlan Thorell